Flavobacterium ceti  is a Gram-negative bacterium from the genus of Flavobacterium which has been isolated from the lung and liver of the whale Ziphius cavirostris.

References

External links
Type strain of Flavobacterium ceti at BacDive -  the Bacterial Diversity Metadatabase

 

ceti
Bacteria described in 2007